Małe Olecko  ( from 1938 to 1945) is a village in the administrative district of Gmina Wieliczki, within Olecko County, Warmian-Masurian Voivodeship, in north-eastern Poland. It is situated on the southern shore of Olecko Małe Lake in Masuria.

History
Małe Olecko was founded in 1541 by Bartosz Leśnicki from Mazovia, who bought land to establish a village. In 1867, it had a population of 535, 93.8% Polish. In 1938, during a massive campaign of renaming of placenames, the government of Nazi Germany renamed it to Herzogshöhe in attempt to erase traces of Polish origin. In 1939, it had a population of 518. Following Germany's defeat in World War II, in 1945, the village became again part of Poland and its historic name was restored.

References

Populated lakeshore places in Poland
Villages in Olecko County
1541 establishments in Poland
Populated places established in 1541